

Otto-Hermann Adolf Brücker (17 October 1899  – 12 December 1964) was a German general during World War II who commanded several divisions. He was a recipient of the Knight's Cross of the Iron Cross.

Awards and decorations
 Knight's Cross of the Iron Cross on 14 April 1945 as Generalmajor and commander of 6. Volksgrenadier-Division

References

Citations

Bibliography

 

1899 births
1964 deaths
Military personnel from Berlin
People from the Province of Brandenburg
Lieutenant generals of the German Army (Wehrmacht)
Prussian Army personnel
German Army personnel of World War I
Recipients of the Knight's Cross of the Iron Cross
German prisoners of war in World War II held by the Soviet Union
Reichswehr personnel
20th-century Freikorps personnel